Razón de Sobra (Eng.: With a Lot of Reason) is the sixth studio album released by Marco Antonio Solís on November 2, 2004. This album became his fifth number-one set on the Billboard Top Latin Albums. It was released in a standard CD presentation and in a CD/DVD combo, including the music video for the single "Mi Mayor Sacrificio" and bonus materials. The album earned a Latin Grammy Award nomination for Best Male Pop Vocal Album. The album sold 75,000 copies in its first day of release.

Track listing

All songs written and composed by Marco Antonio Solís

DVD

Chart performance

Sales and certifications

References

2004 albums
Marco Antonio Solís albums
Fonovisa Records albums